Braeswick is a settlement on the island of Sanday, in Orkney, Scotland. The settlement is within the parish of Cross and Burness, and is situated on the B9070.

See also
Sanday Light Railway

References

External links

National Museums Scotland - Brooch from Braeswick, Sanday, Orkney
BBC Domesday Reloaded - D-block GB-360000-1035000 - Pool, Sanday 
Queen of Naples: Braes Wick, Sanday, Orkney wreck of a 19th-century brig.

Villages in Orkney
Sanday, Orkney